Sierra Springs is a brand of spring water which was first sold in 1950 in the U.S. state of California, but has since branched out to the U.S. west coast and as far east as Texas.

Sierra Springs water originates from a protected spring and has a "natural blend of minerals" which the company asserts "gives it a refreshing, clean taste."

Sierra Springs water was the only brand of bottled water consumed by Adrian Monk (from the Television series Monk), during the first five seasons of the series. In later episodes Monk changed to the fictitious brand Summit Creek.

References

Sierra Springs
Products introduced in 1950